Tazeh Kand (also Romanized as Tāzeh Kand and Tāzehkand; also known as Tāzeh Kand-e Qarah Qūyūn and Mollā Qolī) is a village in Qarah Quyun-e Jonubi Rural District of Qarah Quyun District of Showt County, West Azerbaijan province, Iran. At the 2006 National Census, its population was 1,902 in 494 households, when it was in the former Showt District of Maku County). The following census in 2011 counted 1,910 people in 577 households, by which time the district had been separated from the county, Showt County established, and divided into two districts: the Central District and Qarah Quyun Districts. The latest census in 2016 showed a population of 2,087 people in 649 households; it was the largest village in its rural district.

References 

Showt County

Populated places in West Azerbaijan Province

Populated places in Showt County